The Adventures of Superboy is a proposed TV series that was put into production in 1961. It was meant to capitalize on the success of Adventures of Superman, which went out of production in 1958. Only a pilot episode ("Rajah's Ransom") was produced, although 12 additional scripts had been prepared, had the series been picked up.

It featured the first non-comic book portrayals ever of Superboy and Lana Lang and stands as a forerunner of the later series Superboy, which lasted four seasons and Smallville, which lasted ten seasons.

Cast
 Johnny Rockwell as Superboy/Kal-El/Clark Kent
 Bunny Henning as Lana Lang
 Monty Margetts as Martha Kent

Guest cast
 Ross Elliot as Fred Drake
 Charles Maxwell as Gunner Ferde
 Robert Williams as Chief Parker
 Richard Reeves as Shorty Barnes
 Yvonne White as Miss Gibbs
 Stacy Harris as Jake Ferde
 Jimmy Bates as Jimmie Drake
 Ray Walker as Mr. Edlund
 True Ellison as Donna

Home media
The only stand-alone releases so far for The Adventures of Superboy have been from specialty distributors, such as Video Rarities, which released it on VHS along with The Adventures of Superpup and screen test footage as Superboy and Superpup: The Lost Pilots.

This pilot episode has been included in the 62-disc DVD box set of Smallville: The Complete Series, released by Warner Home Video in November 2011, along with additional bonus features not included in the individual season releases of Smallville.

Other media
A book titled Superboy and Superpup: The Lost Videos, written by Chuck Harter, was published in 1993 by Cult Movies Press. It looked at both The Adventures of Superboy pilot and The Adventures of Superpup pilot, as well as the 12 additional Superboy scripts that were prepared had the Superboy pilot been picked up as a series. The book also claims that a story in issue #88 of the Superboy comic is based on the pilot script. In September 2022, BearmanorMedia.com republished "Superboy & Superpup The Lost Videos" by Chuck Harter, now with a full color cover. The new edition is available in hardback, paperback and e-book editions.

External links 

Information from "Superman Through the Ages"
Look, Up In The Sky: The Amazing Story of Superman - a 2006 documentary containing a clip of the pilot.

References

1961 American television episodes
1960s American television series
Superman television series
Television pilots not picked up as a series
Superboy